Madras Engineer Group (MEG), informally known as the Madras Sappers, is an engineer group of the Corps of Engineers of the Indian Army. The Madras Sappers draw their origin from the erstwhile Madras Presidency army of the British Raj. This regiment has its HQ in Bengaluru. The Madras Sappers are the oldest of the three groups of the Corps of Engineers.

The Madras Sappers were the only regiment of the Madras Presidency Army to survive unscathed the extensive reorganisations that took place between 1862 and 1928. The thambis, as the troops of the Madras Sappers are popularly known, with their hallmark Shakos have distinguished themselves in many battlefields around the world for more than 200 years.

The Bangalore torpedo, a mine clearing explosive device, was invented in the Centre at Bengaluru in the early years of the Twentieth Century.

Timeline
 1780 – Created Madras Pioneers from two company of Pioneers (On 30 September 1780 at Madras Patnam)
 1831 – Renamed Corps of Madras Sappers and Miners
 1834 – Relocated HQ to Bengaluru, where it remains today
 1876 – Receive prefix Queens's Own
 1903 – 2nd Queen's Own Madras Sappers and Miners, Renamed as part of the Kitchener Reforms
 1911 – Renamed 2nd Queen Victoria's Own Madras Sappers and Miners

History
The second half of the eighteenth century found the East India Company involved in the politics of India and in conflict with the French and a number of native states, amongst whom Mysore, the Marathas and the remnants of the Mughal empire were prominent. The newly raised army of the Madras Presidency was deficient of combat pioneers who were raised as 'ad hoc' companies and disbanded after the conflicts. The First Anglo-Mysore War highlighted this deficiency and led to the raising of two companies of the Madras Pioneers  on 30 September 1780 at Fort St George. These men are the forefathers of the Madras Engineer Group of today and the Corps of Engineers of the Indian Army.

The Madras Pioneers formed an integral part of the armed forces. Their principal job in active warfare was to dig 'saps' or 'trenches' which permitted cannon to be brought in range of enemy fortifications and to dig 'mines' which would explode creating a breach in the fort walls. As a result, Sappers and Miners was born. In addition, the sappers used to lead the way to the breach for the 'forlorn hope' and infantry to follow. They also built roads, bridges, fortifications, wells, and water supplies, and fought as infantry when needed.

Since this group was constituted by the Madras Presidency, and formed part of the Madras Army, they were called the Madras Sappers. Likewise in 1803 and again in 1824, the Bengal Sappers and Bombay Sappers were formed in the other presidencies.

The Madras Sappers recruited and trained small tough and wiry men from South India. These engineer troops fought in numerous campaigns in India at Sholinghur, Srirangapatna, Assaye (along with Major General Arthur Wellesley, later Duke of Wellington), and  also in Egypt, China, Burma and other places abroad.

The Madras Sappers moved into Bengaluru in 1834, when they were involved in a major part of the construction activities of the Civilian and Military buildings in Bengaluru. Their association with Bengaluru, where the center is located, continues to this day.

The motto of the Madras Sappers is that common to all three regiments of the Corps of Engineers, Sarvatra (Sanskrit:Everywhere) the Indian equivalent to 'Ubique', the motto of the Royal Engineers.

Battle honours

Pre-World War I

Carnatic (1781–82)
Sholinghur (1781–82)
Mysore (1792)
Seringapatam (1799)
Egypt 1801
Assaye (1803)
Java (1811)
Nagpur (1819)
Mehidpur (1819)
Ava (1825)
China (1840)
Meanee (1843)
Hyderabad (1843)
Pegu (1852)
Persia (1856–57)
Central India (1858)
Lucknow (1858)
Taku Forts (1860)
Pekin (1860)
Abyssinia (1868)
Afghanistan (1878–80)
Egypt (1882)
Tel-el-Kebir (1882)
Suakin (1885)
Tofrek (1885)
Burma (1885–87)
Chitral (1895)
Malakand (1897)
Tirah (1897–98)
Punjab Frontier (1897–98)
Boxer Rebellion (1900)

World War I

France & Flanders (1914–15)
Suez Canal (1915–17)
Egypt (1915–17)
Gaza (1917)
Megiddo (1917)
Sharon (1918)
Palestine (1918)
Baghdad (1915–18)
Mesopotamia (1915–18)
Tigris (1916)
Kut-el-Amara (1917)
India (1917)
Persia (1918)
N.W. Frontier (1914–15)
East Africa (1918)

World War II

Mersa Matruh (1940–43)
Ngakyedauk Pass (1942–45)
Bishenpur (1942–45)
Meiktila (1942–45)
Tamu Road (1942–45)
Cassino I (1943–45)
Abyssinia (1940–41)
North Africa (1940–43)
Iraq (1941)
Syria (1941)
Malaya (1941–42)
Burma (1942–45)
Italy (1943–45)

Post Independence

Zoji La (1948)
Basantar River (1971)
Jammu & Kashmir (1947-48)
Jammu & Kashmir (1965)
Punjab (1965)
Jammu & Kashmir (1971)
Punjab (1971)
East Pakistan (1971)

Symbols

The battle symbols of MEG are, a sphinx to commemorate the victory in Egypt in 1801, an elephant for the victory in Assaye in 1803, a dragon for China(1848), a bighorn sheep for Zoji La (1948), and a tank for Basantar (1971).

Republic Day Parade 
Madras Engineer Group have been actively participating in the annual Republic Day Parade of India.  MEG have been awarded the Best Marching Contingent three times in 1991, 1997 and 2017.

Gallery

See also
 Indian Army
 Indian Army Corps of Engineers
 Bengal Engineer Group
 Bombay Engineer Group
 Madras Sappers Military Band

Notes

Book references

External links
 https://web.archive.org/web/20091027133925/http://www.geocities.com/Athens/Acropolis/9460/remem.htm
 https://web.archive.org/web/20071108123617/http://www.regiments.org/regiments/southasia/art-eng-sig/sm-mad.htm
 https://web.archive.org/web/20090725060217/http://www.remuseum.org.uk/corpshistory/rem_corps_part10.htm
 Sify.com
 

British Indian Army regiments
Indian Army Corps of Engineers
Indian World War I regiments
Indian World War II regiments
Military units and formations established in 1780
1780 establishments in British India
E
Regiments of the Indian Army